The Contax T camera line consists of a number of compact cameras sold by Kyocera under the Contax brand. They were introduced between 1984 and 2002. The T, T2, and T3 use 35mm film and have a fixed 35 mm wide-angle lens. The T-VS, T-VS II, and T-VS III also use 35 mm film but have a 28–56 mm lens. The Tix uses APS film and has a fixed 28 mm wide-angle lens. The TVS Digital is a 5 MP digital camera with a 35–105 mm (equivalent) lens.

In 2005, Kyocera sold its camera business to Cosina and announced it would cease all activity related to the manufacture of Contax cameras at the end of the year.

Contax T-series cameras
Contax T – with 5-element Carl Zeiss Sonnar T* 38 mm manual focus lens (made by Yashica, which was owned by Kyocera, in partnership with Carl Zeiss). Introduced in 1984. Includes a dedicated separate clip-on auto flash (A14).
Contax T2 – with a retracting 5-element Carl Zeiss Sonnar T* 38 mm active autofocus and manual focus lens, made in silver titanium, in black and gold plated finish; 1/500 s max shutter speed. Introduced in 1991. Includes a built-in auto flash.
Contax T3 – smaller than the T2 and with recomputed 6-element (sharper) Carl Zeiss Sonnar T* 35 mm passive autofocus and manual focus lens; 1/1200 s max shutter speed; autofocus lock. Includes a built-in auto flash.

Contax TVS-series cameras
A 35 mm film, compact rangefinder camera with a titanium body. TVS stands for T* Vario-Sonnar for its Carl Zeiss T* Vario-Sonnar lens.
Contax T-VS – 28–56 mm lens with variable stops –; passive phase detection autofocus
Contax T-VS II – 28–56 mm lens with variable stops –
Contax T-VS III – lens has 5 variable stops (30 mm, 37.5 mm, 45 mm, 52.5 mm and 60 mm) –; has a Contax T-style front door cover

Contax Tix camera
Contax Tix (i.e. T4) – an APS film camera with a Carl Zeiss Sonnar T* 28 mm  autofocus lens. Introduced in 1997.

Contax TVS Digital
Contax TVS Digital – 5 MP digital compact camera with a Carl Zeiss T* Vario-Sonnar 35–105 mm – (35 mm equivalent) lens. Introduced in 2002.

See also
Olympus XA – another small rangefinder 35 mm film camera

References

External links
Ken Rockwell on the Contax T

135 film cameras
APS film cameras
Contax rangefinder cameras